The 2015 season is Chonburi's 5th season in the Thai Premier League of Chonburi Football Club.

Team kit
The team kit for the 2010 season is produced by FBT and Chang Beer remain as the main sponsor.

Squad statistics

Transfers

In

 Total spending:  ~ ฿0

Out

 Total income:  ~ ฿3 million

Loans in

Loans out

Matches

Pre-season

League table

Results by round

League

FA Cup

League Cup

Queen's Cup

2010
Chonburi